Tsentraly may also refer to airports in Riga, Moscow, Omsk, or Saratov.

Orenburg Airport  is a civil airport located about 25 km east of Orenburg city. Now defunct Orenair had its head office on the airport property.

The airport was built at its present location in the mid-1970s. In 2011, the government of Orenburg named the airport after Yuri Gagarin.

Airlines and destinations

Incidents and accidents 
On 1 March 1980, an Aeroflot Tupolev Tu-154A crashed on approach to the airport after deviating below a sufficient flight path and touching ground 68 meters ahead of the runway. There were no fatalities, however the aircraft was damaged beyond repair.

References

External links
Official website 

Airports built in the Soviet Union
Airports in Orenburg Oblast